The Delhi Development Authority (DDA) is a planning authority created in 1957 under the provisions of the Delhi Development Act "to promote and secure the development of Delhi". It is responsible for planning, development and construction of housing projects, commercial lands, land management as well as providing public facilities like roads, bridges, drains, underground water reservoirs, community centers, sports centers, green belts etc. within the area of National Capital Territory of Delhi, India.

History

British Raj
In 1922, a tiny Nazul Office consisting of 10 to 12 officials was set up in the Collectorate of Delhi, which was the first authority to regulate the planned development of the city. In 1937, the office was upgraded to an Improvement Trust, constituted under the provisions of the United Provinces Improvement Act, 1911, to control building operations and regulate land usage.

After Independence
 India's independence in 1947 and  resultant migration increased Delhi's population from 7 lakhs to 17 lakhs by 1951. All the open spaces were occupied by migrants. Civic services virtually collapsed. The 2 local bodies at that time, the Delhi Improvement Trust and Municipal Body, were not adequately equipped to cope up with the changing scenario.
Thus, in order to plan Delhi and to check its rapid and haphazard growth, the Central Government appointed a Committee under the chairmanship of Sh. G D. Birla in 1950. This Committee recommended a Single Planning & Controlling Authority for all the urban areas of Delhi. Consequently, the Delhi Development (Provisional) Authority - DDPA - was constituted by promulgating the Delhi (Control of Building Operations) Ordinance, 1955 with the primary objective of ensuring the development of Delhi in accordance with a plan.
The aforementioned ordinance was replaced the Delhi Development Act, 1957 and on 30th December, 1957, the Delhi Development Authority acquired its present name and role.

Master plans

The DDA master plan was formed in 1962 to ensure an organized and structured development of Delhi. This included identification of new land that can be developed into residential properties and as well as be made into self-contained colonies by providing ample commercial office and retail complexes. The DDA master plan was revised in 1982 to formulate the Master Plan 2001 and then re-revised in 2007 to form the Delhi Master Plan 2021. The DDA is currently preparing its 4th master plan for the year of 2041.

Housing

The development of housing projects by DDA commenced in 1967 with the construction of houses and providing the basic amenities like electricity, water supply, sewage disposal along with other infrastructure facilities. The new projects undertaken instigate with recognition of project sites, public announcement about the new DDA housing schemes in various categories through newspapers and other media advertisements, formal acceptance of the applications, a transparent draw system for short-listing of the applicants and finally allotment of the property.

Some popular DDA housing schemes of the past include the New Pattern Registration Scheme that offers home registration along with the property purchase, Janta Housing Registration Scheme that offers house registrations for the economically weaker section category and Ambedkar Awas Yojana that allotted Janta, LIG & MIG (lower and middle income group) category flats to the SC/ST registrants. The residential land is allotted to individual applicants, the farmers whose land is acquired for development and group housing societies through public auction.

1985 housing scheme
The 1985 housing scheme  was a scheme for people with low annual income. The scheme stated that each person can participate by paying Rs 3000 draft on DDA account. The total cost of each house was Rs 35000; recipients had to pay the balance of the amount within a few months. The scheme was subject to criticism due to delays and perceived unequal treatment of applicants. After years of dispute, a new policy was instituted in 2019 requiring submission of a Rs 50,000 draft to the Delhi Urban Shelter Improvement Board or alternatively an appreciated reimbursement of 9000 Rs was offered.

DDA Housing Scheme 2019 
In March 2019, DDA launched a new housing scheme, for around 18,000 flats situated in Vasant Kunj and Narela, which got a lukewarm response from the general public in terms of applications received. Most of the flats of this scheme situated at Narela were the surrendered flats of the earlier DDA Housing Scheme 2017. The results of the DDA Housing Scheme 2019 were announced in July 2019.

Land development

The Delhi Development Authority acquires land for development in Delhi. Besides, the construction projects, DDA land development also includes providing a lush green belt and forest area for a clean and healthy environment by developing regional parks, neighborhood parks, district parks, play fields, and sports complexes.
dda has the authority.

Commercial properties

DDA undertakes construction, development and maintenance of commercial properties like retail shops in local markets, shopping complexes, office complexes, makeshift industrial set ups, hospitals, community halls, clubs, educational institutions, religious segregation centres etc. These properties are disposed through auctions or tenders.

Sports complexes

Delhi Development Authority (DDA) aims to provide an entire network of sports facilities through sports complexes, play fields, multi-facility gymnasiums and fitness centres, golf courses etc. DDA provides the basic infrastructure facilities, coaching through the top sports persons in India, providing stipends and kits and other facilities to identify and train budding sports talent in Delhi.

Besides this DDA also conducts various talent hunt schemes through its Sports Complexes in Dwarka, Saket, Hari Nagar and other areas, including Yamuna Sports Complex and Siri Fort Sports Complex. DDA Dwarka Sports Complex along with DDA Saket Sports Complex plans to host State Level tournaments to provide a platform to professional and amateur sportspeople to showcase their talent.

A list of all the sports complexes in Delhi is as follows:

While known for extensive sports activities, the capital city is now set to get another sports injury centre dedicated to providing immediate treatment to sportspersons. Lal-Bahadur Shastri hospital, a government-run hospital located at Khichripur in East Delhi has taken up this mantle to safeguard the future of sportspersons. 

"Sports injuries are a common occurrence in the sporting world, but timely treatments can help prevent them from escalating to chronic injuries. So, the facility will offer a complete treatment including physiotherapy to ensure a thorough recuperation," suggested Dr. Varun Singh, sports injury specialist, LBS Hospital.

References

External links
 

1955 establishments in India
Organisations based in Delhi
Government agencies established in 1955
State urban development authorities of India
Ministry of Urban Development